Stypandra jamesii is a plant species endemic to the state of Western Australia.

References

Asparagales of Australia
Angiosperms of Western Australia
jamesii
Garden plants
Plants described in 1999